"Revolution" is the first single released in vinyl format by the band Chumbawamba on their label Agit-Prop Records.

Released in 1985, the single was a minor hit in the United Kingdom charting for one week. although it failed to chart. It would later successfully sue them for royalties relating to this and later releases.

The single is now a rare collector's item with less than one thousand copies in existence.

The song has not appeared on any of their studio or compilation albums.

Track listing

As listed on cover:

"1......HMV side, introduction to History and where we stand. Which side of the"
"2......Fence side, and its application to everyday life. The R'n'R Factory strike."

Songs on EP:
 "Adversity"
 "Total Control"
 "Stagnation"
 "Liberation"
 "The Police Have Been Wonderful"
 "Fitzwilliam"

Credits
Engineered by Neil Ferguson
All songs written and produced by Chumbawamba

Chumbawamba on this record are:
Alice Nutter - vocals
Man Afraid - guitar, drums
Loo - guitar, vocals
Dunst - bass, vocals
Boffo - guitar, vocals
Danbert Nobacon - vocals
Artmi (aka Harry Hammer) - drums, guitar
Simon Lanzon - keyboards, voice

References

External links
 Cover art.

Chumbawamba songs
1985 debut singles
Agit-Prop Records singles
1985 songs
Songs against capitalism
Songs about revolutions